Winston-Salem Preparatory Academy (WSPA) is a public school located in Forsyth County, in Winston-Salem, North Carolina. Its building location is at the former site of Atkins High School.

Overview

Small class sizes
There are approximately 85 students per middle school grade and 100 students per high school grade. The average class size is around 20 students per class.

Admission requirements
WSPA students are accepted through a process that includes a written essay, an interview, commitment of parent support, a written agreement, promise of volunteer in support of school activities, and a follow-up by letter indicating acceptance to the WSPA Magnet Program. This admissions are led by the school counselors Rhonda Scott or Cheryl Perry-Jones.

References

External links
WSPA website

High schools in Winston-Salem, North Carolina
Public high schools in North Carolina
Public middle schools in North Carolina
Magnet schools in North Carolina